Prithviraj Sukumaran (/pr̩it̪ʰʋiɾaːd͡ʒ/; born 16 October 1982) is an Indian actor, director, producer and playback singer primarily working in Malayalam cinema. He has also done Tamil, Telugu and Hindi films. He acted in more than 100 films in a variety of roles and has received several awards including a National Film Award, three Kerala State Film Awards, a Tamil Nadu State Film Award and a Filmfare Awards South.

Prithviraj made his acting debut with Nandanam (2002), a commercial success. He established himself as a leading Malayalam actor with Classmates (2006), the highest-grossing Malayalam film of the year. The Kerala State Film Award for Best Actor for Vaasthavam made him its youngest recipient at 24. He played a musician in the Tamil romantic comedy Mozhi (2007) and ventured into playback singing with Puthiya Mukham (2009) before earning his second Kerala State Film Award for Best Actor for medical drama Ayalum Njanum Thammil and biographical film Celluloid.

In 2010, Prithviraj joined the production house August Cinema to then headline and co-produce Urumi and Indian Rupee (both 2011); the latter won the National Film Award for Best Feature Film in Malayalam and Kerala State Film Award for Best Film. He won a Tamil Nadu State Film Award for Best Villain for Kaaviya Thalaivan (2014) before appearing in Ennu Ninte Moideen (2015) and Ezra (2017). After leaving August Cinema in 2017, he launched Prithviraj Productions independently that firstly backed 9 (2019). Prithviraj made his directorial debut with Lucifer (2019), the highest-grossing Malayalam film ever. He has since starred in Driving License (2019), Ayyappanum Koshiyum (2020), Jana Gana Mana (2022) and Kaduva (2022).

Early life 

Prithviraj was born to the actors Sukumaran and Mallika Sukumaran at Thiruvananthapuram.

His family was settled in Tamil Nadu at the time, where he attended Shrine Vailankanni Senior Secondary School in T. Nagar, Chennai, and St. Joseph's Boys School, Coonoor. When the family moved to Kerala, he attended the NSS Public School, Perunthanni. He then moved to St. Mary's Residential Central School, Poojappura where he acted in plays and skits for the school's Annual Day Celebrations. He completed his education at Sainik School, Kazhakootam and Bhavan's Senior Secondary School, Kodunganoor. He also participated and won several debates and elocution competitions while in school. Prithviraj won the title of "Mr LA Fest" in the Annual Inter-School arts festival hosted by Loyola School, Thiruvananthapuram in successive years and is the only person to date to win that title twice.

After school, he studied for a bachelor's degree in Information Technology at the University of Tasmania in Australia. During this time, he auditioned for film director Ranjith and won the lead role in the film Nandanam. It was film director Fazil who introduced him to Ranjith. His elder brother Indrajith Sukumaran and sister-in-law Poornima Indrajith are also film actors.

Career

Malayalam 

In 2001, Prithviraj underwent a screen-test by director Fazil for one of his projects. Even though that project never materialised, Fazil recommended him to director Ranjith, who was planning his second directorial, Nandanam (2002), Prithviraj underwent screen-test for the role and got selected. Though Nandanam was the first film that Prithviraj acted in, it was released after Nakshathrakkannulla Rajakumaran Avanundoru Rajakumari. Prithviraj then appeared in films directed by Lohithadas, Vinayan, Kamal and Bhadran. Shyamaprasad, who cast him in lead role in his film Akale, said that Prithvi's advantages are his talent and intelligence irrespective of his box office successes.

In 2006, he played the role of Sub Inspector Solomon Joseph in Vargam, then appeared in Vaasthavam, for which he received the Kerala State Film Award for Best Actor. He was the youngest actor to win the award. The same year he starred in Lal Jose's Classmates. In 2007, he starred in Chocolate, directed by Shafi. In 2008, he starred in Thalappavu, (directed by Madhupal) and Thirakkatha (directed by Ranjith), playing pivotal characters in both. One of the reviews of Thalappavu describes it as the coming-of-age film for prithviraj describing the "spartan dignity" he brought to his portrayal of the Naxalite Joseph. The Sify review of Thirakkatha describes it as a "genuine attempt that keeps the viewer engaged until the end". Both Thalappavu and Thirakkatha shared the award for the best film in the Film Critics Award for 2008. He also made a special appearance in Anjali Menon's Manjadikuru.

In 2009, the success of Prithviraj Sukumaran's Puthiya Mukham (directed by Diphan) lead to him being called a "Superstar". His other releases in 2009 were Robin Hood (directed by Joshy) and the anthology film Kerala Cafe. In 2010, Sukumaran's notable films were Pokkiri Raja and Anwar, directed by Amal Neerad. In 2011, Prithviraj produced his first film, the multilingual Urumi. Other releases in Malayalam include City of God, Manikyakallu, Veettilekkulla Vazhi and Indian Rupee. Reviewers praised Prithviraj Sukumaran for his performance in Indian Rupee, the critic at Nowrunning.com, who described it as his "career best performance". In 2012, his major releases were Hero, Molly Aunty Rocks! and Ayalum Njanum Thammil, along with cameo roles in Aakashathinte Niram and Manjadikuru. In 2013, Prithviraj had three releases Celluloid, Mumbai Police and Memories, all of which were critical and commercial successes. He portrayed J.C. Daniel in Celluloid, for which he won his second Kerala State Film Award for Best Actor.

In 2014, Prithviraj's first major release was London Bridge, which failed at box office; followed by 7th Day, which turned out to become a commercial success. He also did a cameo role in Munnariyippu. His third release of the year, Sapthamashree Thaskaraha was praised by critics and audiences alike. His first release of 2015 was Picket 43. His second movie of 2015 was Shyamaprasad's Ivide. Prithviraj was widely praised for his acting in the movie. Varun Blake (Prithviraj's character in Ivide) is considered to be one of his best performances till the date. He next appeared in Lijo Jose Pellissery's Double Barrel, which was appreciated for its novelty. His most successful film of the year was Ennu Ninte Moideen, which narrated the tragic love tale of Kanchanamala and Moideen that happened in the 1960s in Mukkam, a riverside village in Kerala. The film opened to critical acclaim, with several critics regarding it as one of the greatest romance films made in Malayalam. His role as Moideen in the film is regarded as one of the best in his career. His next releases Amar Akbar Anthony and Anarkali became a major commercial success at the box office, thus completing a hat-trick of hits ending the year.

Prithviraj had four releases in 2016, debuting with Paavada, a family drama in which he played a drunkard. It met with a positive response and was a commercial success, grossing  16.34 crore from Kerala box office and ran for 100 days in theatres. His following releases Darvinte Parinamam and James & Alice met with mixed reviews, the former told the story of an ordinary man dealing with a local goon and the latter was a family drama that discussed the matter of life and death. His last release, Oozham, an action thriller directed by Jeethu Joseph was a commercial success, earning  15.25 crore in 25 days. He played a demolition expert. In 2017, he starred in the horror film Ezra, which became one of the highest-grossing Malayalam films of the year, grossing  50 crore worldwide, with  33 crore from Kerala box office. He continued the year with Tiyaan, Adam Joan and Vimaanam. Both Tiyaan and Vimaanam were moderate box office hits. Adam Joan collected around 20 crores at the box office and emerging as a superhit.

His first release of 2018 was Roshini Dinakar's romantic drama My Story, a commercial failure at the box office. His next two releases were Anjali Menon's drama Koode and Nirmal Sahadev's crime drama Ranam. Koode received critical acclaim and was a commercial success, while Ranam met with positive critical response but performed moderately at the box office. In 2018, Prithviraj launched his independent production house, Prithviraj Productions. In 2019, he produced and starred in the science fiction film 9. The film received critical praise for its novelty, actors' performance, direction and cinematography. It was a box office hit. Prithviraj made his directorial debut in 2019 with Lucifer, starring Mohanlal, the film became the highest-grossing Malayalam film ever.

Other languages

In 2005, Prithviraj Sukumaran debuted in Tamil through Kana Kandaen. In 2006, Prithviraj co-starred with actor Bhagyaraj's daughter Saranya Bhagyaraj in Parijatham. It has been acclaimed as a hit and gave the actor a turning point in his Tamil film career. In 2007, Prithviraj co-starred in Mozhi. He also starred in Satham Podathey and Kannamoochi Yenada in the same year. In 2008, Prithviraj starred in Vellithirai, the Tamil remake of Udayananu Tharam. Rediff described his performance: "Prithviraj ... makes the best of his assets – his expressive eyes, which glint in fury, soften with love, or brim over with frustrated tears." The Tamil remake of Classmates, titled Ninaithale Inikkum, was released in 2009. He played a cop in Mani Ratnam's Raavanan in 2010 with Vikram playing the main protagonist and his performance was critically acclaimed. Prithviraj played one of the main characters in director Vasanthabalan's big budget period film Kaaviya Thalaivan, in which he co-stars with Siddharth.

Prithviraj Sukumaran debuted in Telugu through Police Police, which was released in 2010. Besides, Prithviraj has had many of his Malayalam films dubbed into Telugu such as Sivapuram in 2006, which was the dubbing of Ananthabhadram and ATM in 2010, which was the dubbing of Robin Hood. The dubbed version of Urumi released in August 2011.

Prithviraj debuted in Bollywood through Aiyyaa, directed by Sachin Kundalkar. Aiyyaa, which was jointly produced by Anurag Kashyap and Viacom 18 released on 12 October 2012. His second film Aurangzeb, directed by Athul Sabharwal, released on 17 May 2013. His performance was highly praised. His next film was Naam Shabana in 2017, in which he played the antagonist.

Personal life 
Prithviraj married BBC India reporter Supriya Menon on 25 April 2011 in a private ceremony held in Palakkad. They have a daughter, Alankrita born in 2014. His family resides in Thevara, Kochi.

Filmography

Awards and nominations

See also 
 August Cinema
 Empuraan (franchise)

References

External links 

 

Indian male film actors
Kerala State Film Award winners
Living people
Malayali people
Male actors from Thiruvananthapuram
Indian Hindus
Male actors in Tamil cinema
1982 births
Male actors in Malayalam cinema
Sainik School alumni
Film producers from Thiruvananthapuram
Malayalam film producers
21st-century Indian male actors
Male actors in Hindi cinema
Indian male playback singers
Singers from Thiruvananthapuram
Malayalam playback singers
Male actors in Telugu cinema
South Indian International Movie Awards winners